Solar cycle 7 was the seventh solar cycle since 1755, when extensive recording of solar sunspot activity began. The solar cycle lasted 10.5 years, beginning in May 1823 and ending in November 1833 (thus overlapping the Dalton Minimum).  The maximum smoothed sunspot number observed during the solar cycle was 119.2 (November 1829), and the starting minimum was 0.2.

See also
List of solar cycles

References

Solar cycles